The following are the football (soccer) events of the year 1954 throughout the world.

Events
 May 8 – The Asian Football Confederation is founded in Manila, Philippines.
 June 15 – UEFA is founded in Basel, Switzerland.

Winners club national championship
: KF Partizani Tirana
: Boca Juniors
: Rapid Vienna
: R.S.C. Anderlecht
 Bulgaria: CSKA Sofia
: Spartak Prague Sokolovo
 Denmark: Køge BK
 East Germany: BSG Turbine Erfurt
 England: Wolverhampton Wanderers F.C.
 Faroe Islands: KÍ Klaksvík
 Finland: Pyrkivä Turku
: Lille OSC
 Greece: Olympiacos F.C.
 Hungary: Budapest Honvéd FC
: ÍA
: Shamrock Rovers F.C.
: Internazionale Milano F.C.
: Jeunesse Esch
: FC Eindhoven
: Linfield F.C.
: Skeid
: Polonia Bytom
: Sporting CP
 Romania: Flamura Roșie Arad
: Celtic F.C.
 Spain: Real Madrid
: GAIS
 Switzerland: FC La Chaux-de-Fonds
 USSR: Dynamo Moscow
: Hannover 96
: Dinamo Zagreb

International tournaments
1954 British Home Championship (October 10, 1953 – April 2, 1954)

 FIFA World Cup in Switzerland (June 16 – July 4, 1954)

Births
 January 5 — Jan Everse, Dutch footballer and manager
 February 7 — Jimmy Bailey, Honduran international footballer
 February 13 — Dominique Bathenay, French international footballer
 February 19 — Sócrates, Brazilian international footballer (died 2011)
 April 1 — Giancarlo Antognoni, Italian international footballer 
 April 14 — László Fekete, Hungarian international footballer (died 2014)
 April 19 — Trevor Francis, English international footballer and manager
 May 18 — Eric Gerets, Belgian international footballer and manager
 May 12 — Wolfgang Dremmler, German international footballer
 June 26 — Luis Arconada, Spanish international footballer
 July 15 — Mario Kempes, Argentinian international footballer
 August 18 — Jan Peters, Dutch international footballer
 August 22 — Emilio Campos, Venezuelan international footballer
 August 24 — Heini Otto, Dutch footballer and manager
 October 30 — Ramón Maradiaga, Honduran footballer and manager
 November 18 — Adrie Koster, Dutch footballer and manager
 December 1 — François Van der Elst, Belgian international footballer (died 2017)

Deaths
 January 31 – Vivian Woodward, English footballer (born 1879)

References

 
Association football by year